A special election was held in  to fill a vacancy left by the death of Representative-elect William Dowse (F) on February 18, 1813, before the beginning of the 13th Congress.  The election was held April 27–29, 1813.

Election results
The initial results were as follows:

Bowers was declared the winner of the special election

Election challenge
Williams subsequently challenged Bowers' election on the ground that the votes for "Isaac Williams" were intended for himself.  The House Committee on Elections investigated this election and found that there were three individuals in the 15th district with the name Isaac Williams, one of whom used the suffix "Jr.".  Both contestants admitted that the only candidates in the election were Isaac Williams, Jr. and John M. Bowers.  On July 2, The Committee ruled that Williams appeared to be entitled to the seat, but that further investigation was required, and postponed further discussion to the first Wednesday of the 2nd session.

On December 16, 1813, the Committee made a final report determining that in the towns of Exeter, Milford, and Westford, 322 votes which were, in fact, cast for Isaac Williams, Jr. were mistakenly reported as Isaac Williams.  The Committee ruled that those 322 votes were thus to be added to Isaac Williams, Jr.'s votes, creating a final tally as follows:

Williams was thus ruled by the Committee to be the legitimate occupant of that seat.  The House accepted their ruling unanimously, and Williams took his seat January 24, 1814

See also
List of special elections to the United States House of Representatives

References
Information of numbers of votes and on the challenge in the House are from Cases of Contested Elections in Congress: From the Year 1789 to 1834, Inclusive

New York 1813 15
1813 15
New York 1813 15
New York 15
United States House of Representatives
United States House of Representatives 1813 15
February 1813 events